Hyaloctoides gorgoneus is a species of tephritid or fruit flies in the genus Hyaloctoides of the family Tephritidae.

Distribution
Cape Verde Islands.

References

Tephritinae
Insects described in 1958
Diptera of Africa